Çiğdem Can (born July 5, 1976 in Istanbul, Turkey) is a Turkish volleyball player. She is 184 cm and plays as middle player. She has played for Fenerbahçe Acıbadem team since 2006 and wears number 12. Çiğdem is the team's captain. She played 280 times for national team. She also played for Vakıfbank Güneş Sigorta, Eczacıbaşı and TOKI.

Career

Personal honors
 13 times Turkish Women's League Champion
 5 times Turkish Cup Champion
 1 time 2005 Mediterranean Games Champion
 1 time Women's CEV Top Teams Cup Champion
 2 times Women's CEV Champions League Runner-Up
 2008-09 Women's CEV Top Teams Cup 3rd place
 2008-09 Aroma Women's Volleyball League Champion with Fenerbahçe Acıbadem
 2009-10 Aroma Women's Volleyball League Champion with Fenerbahçe Acıbadem
 2009 Turkish Cup Champion with Fenerbahçe Acıbadem
 2009 Turkish Super Cup Champion with Fenerbahçe Acıbadem
 2010 Turkish Super Cup Champion with Fenerbahçe Acıbadem
 2009-10 CEV Champions League Runner-Up with Fenerbahçe Acıbadem
 2010 FIVB World Club Championship Champion with Fenerbahçe Acıbadem
 2010-11 CEV Champions League -  Bronze medal, with Fenerbahçe Acıbadem
 2010-11 Aroma Women's Volleyball League -  Champion, with Fenerbahçe Acıbadem

See also 
 Turkish women in sports

References

External links
 Player profile at fenerbahce.org

1976 births
Living people
Volleyball players from Istanbul
Turkish women's volleyball players
Fenerbahçe volleyballers
Eczacıbaşı volleyball players
VakıfBank S.K. volleyballers
Turkish expatriate volleyball players
Turkish expatriate sportspeople in Italy
20th-century Turkish sportswomen
21st-century Turkish sportswomen